Beijing Street Church is a Protestant church located in Dalian, China. It is the former Dalian Lutheran Church and its church building is now a Historical Building Protected by Dalian City. It was recently renamed as Dalian City Cheng-en Church (literally "Dalian City Receiving Grace Church"), but the local people still call it "Beijing Street Church."

Brief history
 From 1895, the Danish National Church (Evangelical Lutheran Church of Denmark) sent missions to Beijing and northern China, and in 1914, built the Dalian Lutheran Church, in this city which was Japan's leased territory at that time.
 It officially belonged to the Lutheran Church of Northern China, of Lutheran Church of China. In the nearby naval port of Lüshun, another Lutheran church was built, which also still exists.
 At the end of the Second World War and the establishment of the People's Republic of China. it came to be known as Beijing Street Church.  When the Cultural Revolution 1966-1977 ended and Christian worship restarted, it came to belong to the post-denominational China Christian Council.
 The offices of the China Christian Council and Three-Self Patriotic Movement Committee of Dalian City, which used to be housed in the former rectory of this church, had recently moved to May 1 Square.
 In 2002, it was listed as a Historic Building Under Protection of the City of Dalian.
 In 2006, was renamed as Dalian City Cheng-en Church  (literally "Dalian City Receiving Grace Church), but the local people still call it "Beijing Street Church."

At This Church Today
 Address: No. 605, Changjiang Road, Xi-gang District, Dalian City, Liaoning Province 116011
 The church keeps the form of the building as it was built in 1914.
 Among the six Protestant churches in the six Districts of Dalian, this church, Yuguang Street Church and Lüshun Church retain the original buildings, while Harvest Church, Xinggong Church for the Korean Chinese and Jinzhou Church were rebuilt in the past ten years.
 Chinese Language services are held on Friday evening (for youth) and three times (8, 9, 10 am) on Sunday.  Bible study is also done.
 English Bible study on Sundays behind the sanctuary, 2:00-4:00 pm. Mostly native Chinese adults seeking to practice their English. Foreign English speakers are welcomed. Class uses the English Standard Version (ESV) Bible (c) 2001, 2008 Crossway Bible published by Chinese National Committee of the Three-Self Movement of the Protestant Churches in China and China Christian Council. Authorized by the Chinese government.
 Baptism is done usually on Sunday a week or two before Christmas Day or Easter.
 A Christmas program including the 50-member chorus is held on Christmas Eve.  On Christmas Day, no service is held, but the song and dance programs are held from morning till a little after noon.
 A play from the Bible is held each year on a weekend after Christmas.

See also

 Christianity and Protestantism
 Christianity in China, Protestantism in China and Three-Self Patriotic Movement
 Danish National Church (Evangelical Lutheran Church of Denmark)
 Holy Cross Church, Wanzhou (Former Lutheran church in Chongqing)
 Yuguang Street Church and Dalian Catholic Church in Dalian, China

External links
China Christian Council home page in Chinese and English
Christian churches and theological seminaries, China Christian Council) ( (Addresses and phone numbers, in Chinese)

References

Protestant churches in China
Churches in Dalian
Lutheran churches in Asia
20th-century Lutheran churches
Lutheranism in China
Danish diaspora in Asia